Cryptaulax was introduced by Skuja (Skuja, 1948). He considered it to be a type of cryptomonad.  Subsequent studies suggest that it is euglenozoan.  Because Skuja had clearly misidentified the flagellate as a cryptomonad, Vørs  argued that at least some species should be placed in the genus Rhynchobodo. This thinking was not adopted by Simpson.  The genus had been erected by Skuja to accommodate Spiromonas akopus,  described by him in 1939. The genus name Spiromonas had previously been applied to other organisms. This invalidates the name according to the rules of nomenclature, and requires a replacement name - hence Cryptaulax.  The similarity of the general morphology of C. akopus with other species that have been studied in more detail and deemed to be euglenozoan support the argument that the genus is euglenozoan.

Species  
Cryptaulax akopos – Cryptaulax conoidea – Cryptaulax elegans  – Cryptaulax formica – Cryptaulax longiciliatus – Cryptaulax marina – Cryptaulax taeniata – Cryptaulax vulgaris

References

External links 
 
 

Cryptomonad genera